Kanyeria (born May 23, 1985) is a Kenyan music producer, composer, sound engineer and song writer based in Nairobi, Kenya but has worked with artists and record labels in Kenya and Tanzania.

Kanyeria was born Kennedy Kanyeria in Nairobi, Kenya and lived in Ruaraka. He attended GSU Primary School and Aquinas High School and later joined the Kenya School of Monetary Studies where he attained an associate degree in Banking. While in college, Kanyeria started producing music for upcoming artists and eventually found his way to the mainstream music production when he joined 41 Records in Tanzania in 2010.During this period, he worked with Tanzanian musicians like Matonya, Fid-Q, Lufu (Half Animal), Masharikanz, Ashimba, Mbeya, Z-Antony, Ali Kiba and T.I.D. Kanyeria produced "Kenya we pray" a song by 8 Kenyan artists seeking to remind young Kenyans to be patriotic.

In 2011, Kanyeria moved back to Kenya and joined Bernsoft Studios where he worked with Kenyan artists like Jua Cali, P-Unit, Collo, Didge, Big Pin, Juliani, Joey Muthengi and others.

Kanyeria has also featured in a number of songs as a singer.

References

Living people
Kenyan musicians
1985 births